The 2018–19 BPL season, also known as BPL 6 or UCB BPL 2019 Powered by TVS (for sponsorship reasons), was the sixth season of the  Bangladesh Premier League (BPL), the top level professional Twenty20 cricket franchise league in Bangladesh. The competition was organised by the Bangladesh Cricket Board (BCB), featuring seven teams from seven cities. Teams are restricted to having four overseas players per side, instead of five in the previous edition of the tournament. Rangpur Riders were the defending champions.

Originally, the season was scheduled to start on 1 October 2018 and end on 16 November 2018. However, in May 2018, it was reported that the tournament might be moved to January 2019, because of security concerns around the Bangladeshi general election, which took place in December 2018. In July 2018, it was confirmed that the tournament would start in January 2019. For this edition of the tournament, the Decision Review System (DRS) were used for the first time.

In the final match, Comilla Victorians defeated Dhaka Dynamites by 17 runs to win their second title. In the final match, Tamim Iqbal was awarded the man of the match award, after scoring 141 not out. Rilee Rossouw was the leading run scorer in the tournament with 558 runs. Shakib Al Hasan was the leading wicket taker with 22 wickets and also won the player of the tournament award.

Draft and squads
By 30 September 2018 the team franchises announced the names of their retained players for the tournament and their icon players. A players' draft was initially scheduled to take place on 25 October 2018. However, the date was moved to 28 October due to a schedule clash with the ODI series between Bangladesh and Zimbabwe.

The rest of the players were bought from the Players' Draft, which was held on 28 October 2018. Litton Das and Mustafizur Rahman were new additions to the list while Soumya Sarkar and Sabbir Rahman were excluded from the list. Initially, Steve Smith was barred from playing in the tournament by the Bangladesh Cricket Board (BCB). However, the BCB overturned its decision, allowing Smith to take part in the competition.

Venues
A total of 46 matches was played in these venues with the playoffs and final will be held at Dhaka. This season 3 venues will host all matches in 4 phases. In the first phase Dhaka will host 14 matches then Sylhet will host 8 matches in the second phase. Dhaka will again host 6 matches in the third phase while then Chittagong will host 10 matches of fourth phase. Final tournament will return to Dhaka again for playoffs and Final matches.

Results

Points table
  advanced to the Qualifier 1
  advanced to the Eliminator

League progression

League stage

A total of 42 matches were played in the league stage, with 24 matches played in Dhaka, 8 matches in Sylhet and 10 in Chittagong.

Phase 1 (Dhaka)

Phase 2 (Sylhet)

Phase 3 (Dhaka)

Phase 4 (Chittagong)

Phase 5 (Dhaka)

Playoffs

Eliminator

Qualifiers
Qualifier 1

Qualifier 2

Final

Statistics

Most runs

Most wickets

Highest team totals

See also
 Chittagong Vikings in 2019
 Comilla Victorians in 2019
 Dhaka Dynamites in 2019

References

External links
 Series home at ESPN Cricinfo

Bangladesh Premier League seasons
2018 in Bangladeshi cricket
Bangladesh Premier League